Triantha japonica is a species of flowering plant in the genus Triantha. It is native to Japan, and is the only Triantha species without a presence in North America. It was first described by John Gilbert Baker in 1879.

References 

Tofieldiaceae
Plants described in 1879